The Ciutat de Tarragona International Award for Musical Composition (formerly known as Tarragona International Musical Composition Prize or Ciutat de Tarragona International Composition Competition) is a composition competition taking place yearly in Tarragona (Catalonia, Spain), organized by the Tarragona City Council. It was founded in 1993, and was accepted into the World Federation of International Music Competitions in 1996.

The competition
The competition is open to all composers, regardless of nationality or age. Symphonic works with or without soloists (up to a maximum of 3 are allowed) and with or without electro-acoustic devices are eligible. Submitted works must be unpublished, must never have been performed in public or have received any award, whether under their current title or any other, and must not have been previously commissioned. Winning work is premiered the following year by the Barcelona Symphony and Catalonia National Orchestra and a 12.000 euro cash prize (in 2010).

Juries
Members of the jury have included Josep M. Mestres Quadreny, Héctor Parra, Jean Pierre Dupuy, Vicent Paulet, Tomás Marco, Antón García Abril, Martín Matalon, José Manuel López López, Agustí Charles Soler, Albert Sardà, Josep Soler, Edmon Colomer, Joan Guinjoan, Enrico Correggia, and Jordi Cervelló.

Winners
Prize-winners include:
1993 Alejandro Civilotti and Jean Gabriel Vincent Paulet
1994 Agustí Charles Soler and Robert Patterson
1995 Yang Yong and Lance R. Hulme
1996 Agustí Charles Soler and Hiroshi Nakamura
1997 Hiroshi Nakamura and Antonio Priolo
1998 Jen Michel Gillard and Charles Norman Mason
1999 Thomas Ingoldsby
2000 Sergio Blardony Soler
2001 Carlos Satué Ros
2002 Luca Belcastro
2003 Andrés Luis and Maupoint Alvárez
2004 Paolo Boggio
2005 Eduardo Soutullo García
2006 José Luis Campana
2007 Musheng Chen
2008 Ramón Humet
2009 - (no competition)
2010 Xavier Pagès i Corella.

References

External links
 Rules of the competition (2010)
 World Federation of International Music Competitions
 Tarragona City Council

Music competitions in Catalonia
Catalan awards